Swissveg, previously known as the Swiss Association for Vegetarianism (German: , SVV), is a Swiss association in the legal context of article 60ff of the Swiss civil code (SCC), where members are exclusively vegetarians. Swissveg runs campaigns, organizes events with the goal to reduce the consumption of animal products.

Organisation 
The association has its registered office in Winterthur. The president is Renato Pichler, who is also on the board of EVU.

Swissveg is the biggest community in Switzerland for vegetarians and vegans.

History
On 3 March 2014 the name of the association was changed to Swissveg.

The association is an active member of the EVU and the International Vegetarian Union. It is also associated with the organisation ProVeg in Germany.

V-Label
Swissveg has, together with the EVU, developed the European Vegetarianism-Label V-Label. They control which products and services can use this label within Switzerland. Products with the V-label are available at all major groceries in Switzerland: For example in Migros and Coop (Switzerland). About 350 Swiss companies use the V-Label.

Events

Swissveg annually organises several events, including vegetarian and vegan festivals. Veganmanias have been held since 2011. The 2016 edition in Aarau attracted 5,000 visitors, making it the largest of all vegan festivals in Switzerland. Previous editions were held in Winterthur, but due to a lack of space to accommodate the attendees, the organisation chose to move the festival to Aarau. In Gossau, St. Gallen, Veganmania was held first in 2017, then featuring 60 stands.

See also
 List of vegetarian organizations
 Vegetarianism by country

References

External links
 

Organizations established in 1993
Vegetarian organizations
Vegetarianism in Switzerland